T-1123 is a carbamate-based acetylcholinesterase inhibitor. It was investigated as a chemical warfare agent starting in 1940. It does not go through the blood-brain barrier due to the charge on quaternary nitrogen. The antidote is atropine. T-1123 is a quaternary ammonium ion. A phenyl carbamate ester is bonded in the meta position to the nitrogen on a diethylmethyl amine. The chloride and methylsulfate salt of T-1123 is TL-1299 and TL-1317, respectively.

Synthesis
T-1123 can be produced from m-diethylaminophenol, methyl isocyanate and methyl iodide. First, m-diethylaminophenol is reacted with methyl isocyanate to produce a methylcarbamate. The resulting methylcarbamate is then reacted with methyl iodide to produce T-1123.

See also
Miotine
Neostigmine
TL-1238
 TMTFA

References

Extra reading

Carbamate nerve agents
Quaternary ammonium compounds
Phenol esters
Acetylcholinesterase inhibitors
Chemical weapons
Aromatic carbamates